Sarah Jane Salazar, born Marissa Reynon (1975 – June 11, 2000), was a Filipino AIDS activist and educator and the second Filipino to go public with HIV at age 19 in 1994 .
  The first was Dolzura Cortez.

Biography
She contracted HIV from a foreign customer while working as a club entertainer in the early 1990s.

Her life story was made into a movie The Secrets of Sarah Jane/Sana'y mapatawad mo in 1994 starring Gelli de Belen, who won a best actress award for the role at the 1995 Gawad Urian Awards.

Controversies

In 1997, at 21 and already an HIV educator, Salazar was charged with child abuse for having sex with a 16-year-old Ritchie Atizado.  She then became pregnant and gave birth to a son. Atizado said that they were lovers. He later tested positive for HIV.

Death
Salazar died on June 11, 2000 at the age of 25 from AIDS complications. Before her death, Salazar was confined at the National Center for Mental Health after being diagnosed with manic depression which doctors said may have been related to anti-AIDS drugs she was taking. She was survived by her boyfriend Ritchie, who was also HIV positive and her 2 children who tested negative for HIV.

References

AIDS-related deaths in the Philippines
1975 births
2000 deaths
HIV/AIDS activists